HD 104985 b, also named Meztli , is an extrasolar planet approximately 97 parsecs (317 lys) from the SunThe 198-day period planet orbits the yellow giant star HD 104985 (Tonatiuh) at a distance of 0.78 AU. With a mass 61/3 times Jupiter it is a gas giant.

Following its discovery in 2003 the planet was designated HD 104985 b. In July 2014 the International Astronomical Union launched NameExoWorlds, a process for giving proper names to certain exoplanets and their host stars. The process involved public nomination and voting for the new names. In December 2015, the IAU announced the winning name was Meztli for this planet. The winning name was submitted by the Sociedad Astronomica Urania of Morelos, Mexico. 'Meztli' was the Aztec goddess of the Moon.

References

External links 
 
 Orbit simulation

Exoplanets discovered in 2003
Giant planets
Camelopardalis (constellation)
Exoplanets detected by radial velocity
Exoplanets with proper names